Arron is both a given name and a surname. Notable people with the name include:

Given name
Arron Afflalo, American basketball player
Arron Asham, Canadian hockey player
Arron Crawford, Australian cricketer
Arron Davies, Welsh footballer
Arron Fray, English footballer
Arron Mosby (born 1999), American football player
Arron Oberholser, American golfer
Arron Perry, Canadian military sniper
Arron Sears, American football player
Arron Yan, Taiwanese singer and actor

Surname
Bennett Arron, English comedian
Christine Arron, French athlete
Henck Arron, Prime Minister of Suriname

See also 
 Aaron (given name)
 Aaron (surname)
 Aron (name)
 Aarons (surname)
 Aaronson, surname